Cars for Kids is an American 501(c) non-profit organization, The company was founded by Grant East, headquartered in Dallas, Texas. The car donation program is in 50 states, including California, Arizona, New York, New Jersey, Florida, Maryland, and Virginia.

History
Cars for Kids was established in 1992 as a non-profit organization to donate vehicles to help kids across America. The company is operated by its CEO, Colin Weatherwax, COO, Amanda Hollins, and CMO, Raul E. Machuca Jr. Cars for Kids began receiving donations in the late 1980s and used its trademark for advertising campaigns in the early 1990s. Its campaigns included between two and five radio advertisements per week by Bonnie Curry, a radio personality.

The organization has concentrated its support on Texas institutions that assist students in completing their high school degrees, and on February 17 during a grant presentation in Dallas, it gave $1,000,000 to the Texans Can Academies. Since 1985, it has had an effect on more than 171,800 lives in Texas through education.

Achievements
In 2022, Cars for Kids was honored with one of the first Top-Rated Awards of 2022 from Great Nonprofits and the Platinum Seal of Transparency by GuideStar Candid.
In 2019 the organization received Nonproft of the Year Award by Big D Magazine.

References

Non-profit organizations based in California
Non-profit organizations based in Alabama
Non-profit organizations based in New York (state)
Non-profit organizations based in New Jersey
Non-profit organizations based in Maryland
Non-profit organizations based in Florida
Non-profit organizations based in Virginia
Children's charities based in the United States
Non-governmental organizations